William Ridley Wills II (born June, 1934) is an American author and historian living in Nashville, Tennessee, who has authored 28 historical and biographical books as of 2021.  He received the Tennessee History Book Award in 1991 for his first book, The History of Belle Meade: Mansion, Plantation and Stud. He is a past president of the Tennessee Historical Society and in 2016, was given an Honorary Doctor of Humane Letters from The University of the South.   He is a former executive of a company founded by his grandfather, the National Life and Accident Insurance Company  and was on the boards of trust of Vanderbilt University and  Montgomery Bell Academy, a prep school for boys in Nashville.

Family history

Wills' grandfather was businessman William Ridley Wills, one of the founders of the National Life and Accident Insurance Company in Nashville in 1902. In 1925, the company launched radio station WSM on the fifth floor of its building and created the country music broadcast, the Grand Ole Opry. The grandfather built a home in Nashville called "Far Hills", which, after his death in 1949, became the permanent residence for the Governor of Tennessee.

Wills' father, Jesse Ely Wills, was a graduate from Vanderbilt University, Phi Beta Kappa, in 1922. While a student there, Jesse Wills  and  his older cousin, William Ridley Wills (who had the identical name of Jesse's father), were  members of "The Fugitives", a literary movement of the 1920s that included  Allen Tate, Robert Penn Warren, John Crowe Ransom, Donald Davidson and Cleanth Brooks. Jesse Wills' sonnets were published in the poetry magazine, The Fugitive in 1923. Jesse Wills became board chairman of the National Life and Accident Insurance Company. He helped establish the "Fugitive Room" as a depository for Fugitive papers and manuscripts as part of a wing of Vanderbilt's Joint University Libraries building.

Ridley Wills II's mother was Ellen McClung Buckner. His maternal grandmother was Elizabeth Buckner, the granddaughter of Gen. William Giles Harding. Wills married Irene Weaver Jackson in 1962.

Career

Ridley Wills II went to work for the family firm, National Life, after graduating from Vanderbilt in 1956. He had worked his way up to senior vice president by the time the firm was taken over by American General Life and Accident Insurance Company in 1982. At that point, Wills said, "the culture changed, and they began doing things differently." He added, "I decided to leave, but I was only 49 years old. I had to figure out what to do next, so I decided I'd raise money for organizations I cared about, serve on their boards, and start writing books." As of 2021, he has written 28 books, primarily histories and biographies relating to the city of Nashville. Wills served on the Vanderbilt University Board of Trust and was board chair of Montgomery Bell Academy for nine years. He is a past president and trustee for the Tennessee Historical Society and in 1991 received the Tennessee History Book Award given by the Tennessee Library Association for his work, The History of Belle Meade: Mansion, Plantation and Stud. In 2016, he was given an Honorary Doctor of Humane Letters from The University of the South.

List of works
 The Belle Meade Farm: Its Landmarks and Out-Buildings (1986)
The History of Belle Meade: Mansion, Plantation and Stud  (1991)
Old Enough to Die (1996)
Touring Tennessee: A Postcard Panorama, 1898-1955  (1996)
Tennessee Governors at Home: Executive Residences of Tennessee's First Families  (1999)
Belle Meade Country Club: The First 100 Years (2001)
Joe C. Davis Jr. 1919–1989 (2001)
Gentleman, Scholar, Athlete: The History of Montgomery Bell Academy (2005)
Yours to Count On: A Biography of Nashville Banker Extraordinaire Sam M. Fleming (2007)
 Elizabeth and Matt, a Love Story (2007)
 The Hermitage At One Hundred: Nashville's First Million Dollar Hotel(2009)
Nashville Pikes, Volume One: 150 Years Along Franklin Pike and Granny White Pike
Nashville Pikes, Volume Two: 150 Years along the Hillsboro Pike
Nashville Pikes, Volume Three: 150 Years Along Harding Pike
Nashville Pikes, Volume Four: 150 Years Along Charlotte. Clifton and Hydes Ferry
Nashville Pikes, Volume Five: 150 Years Along Buena Vista, Whites Creek, Brick Church, and Dickerson Pikes
Nashville Pikes, Volume Six: 150 Years Along Gallatin and Vaughn Pikes
Nashville Pikes, Volume Seven: 150 Years Along McGavock and Lebanon Pikes
Jessie and Ridley: They Made a Difference
Nashville Streets and Their Stories (2014)
Elizabeth and Matt
The YMCA of Middle Tennessee: Three Centuries of Service
Disastrous Deaths
Lest We Forget: Nashville's Lost Businesses and Their Stories
Heritage, Highballs and Hijinks: Colorful Characters I've Known
The Hermitage at 100: Nashville's First Million Dollar Hotel
Chickering Road and Its People 
Belle Meade: A Legacy of Land, Lives, and Love

Honors and awards

Chairman YMCA Foundation of Metropolitan Nashville, 1984
President Tennessee Historical Society 1985–1987
Honorary Doctor of Humane Letters from The University of the South, (2016).
National Trust for History Preservation, 1988–1991
United Way De Toqueville Award, 1989
Tennessee History Book Award, 1991
Distinguished Alumnus Award, Montgomery Bell Academy, 1996
Trustee, Cumberland Museum and Science Center, 1984
H.G. Hill Award, YMCA of Middle Tennessee, 2003

References

1934 births
Vanderbilt University alumni
Living people
People from Nashville, Tennessee
20th-century American male writers